Sean Joseph Vanhorse (born July 22, 1968) is a former professional American football cornerback for five seasons for the San Diego Chargers, the Detroit Lions, and the Minnesota Vikings in the National Football League. His collegiate career was at Howard University.

Vanhorse is retired, and living in Alpharetta, Georgia with his wife Juliee and has two children, Sydne and Solomon.  Solomon, is a running back at James Madison University.

References

1968 births
Living people
Players of American football from Baltimore
American football cornerbacks
Howard Bison football players
San Diego Chargers players
Detroit Lions players
Minnesota Vikings players